Trying Again is a British comedy television series shown on the Sky Living channel in 2014.

On 17 October 2014, the channel announced that the show will not be returning for a second series.

Plot
The show revolves around a couple, Meg and Matt, who are working to have their relationship recover following Meg's affair with her boss. Six months after the affair, the couple are struggling to get their love life back on track. Highlighting friendships and love and all the problems those things bring, Trying Again focusses on a relationship between people who make mistakes but live in the hope that love will conquer all.

Cast
 Jo Joyner as Meg
 Chris Addison as Matt
 Charles Edwards as Iain, Meg's boss
 Elizabeth Berrington as Gail, Matt's sister
 Alun Cochrane as Sam, Matt's friend and co-worker
 Alex MacQueen as Martin, Meg's co-worker
 Catherine Steadman as Kate, Iain's Girlfriend
 Katherine Jakeways as Paula, couples therapist
 Ethan Lawrence as Ryan

Episodes

DVD
No DVD has been released yet.

References

External links

2010s British sitcoms
2014 British television series debuts
2014 British television series endings
Sky sitcoms
English-language television shows
Sky Living original programming
Television shows set in Cumbria